A toy is an object used in play.

Toy or TOY may also refer to:

People
 Toy (surname), a list of people with the surname
 Toy (given name), a list of people with the given name
 Dorothy Toy, stage name of Japanese-American dancer Shigeko Takahashi (1917–2019)
 Toy (footballer, born 1977), Cape Verdean-Portuguese footballer

Film
 Toys (film), a 1992 film starring Robin Williams
 The Toy (1976 film), a French comedy
 The Toy (1982 film), starring Richard Pryor

Music

Groups
 Toy (English band), an English rock band
 Toy (Norwegian band), an electronic duo
 Toy (South Korean band), a South Korean music group
 Toy (German band), a German band
 The Toys, an American pop girl group
 The Toys, former name of Berlin (band)

Albums
 Toy (Toy album), the band's self-titled debut album
 Toy (EP), a 1997 EP by Faye Wong
 Toy (David Bowie album), an album by David Bowie
 Toy (Yello album), 2016
 Toy (A Giant Dog album), 2017
 Toys (Funkadelic album), 2008
 Toys (Uri Caine album), 1995

Songs
 "Toy" (song), a song by Netta Barzilai, representing Israel, which won the 2018 Eurovision Song Contest
 "Toys", a song by Spandau Ballet from Journeys to Glory

Other uses 
 Toy, Iran, a village in North Khorasan Province
 To-y, a 1985 manga/anime series
 Toys (video game), a 1993 Super NES and Sega Genesis action video game based on the film
 Toy (chewing gum), a chewing gum sold in Sweden
 Toy (graffiti)
 Toy dog
 Toys (novel), a novel by James Patterson and Neil McMahon
 Toyama Airport, Japan, IATA airport code

See also
 Toyz (disambiguation)